Giacinto Diano or Diana (28 March 1731 – 13 August 1803) was an Italian painter, active in Southern Italy in a style that mixes Rococo and Neoclassicism.

Life
Giacinto was born in Pozzuoli, and died in Naples. He trained in the studio of Francesco De Mura, whose work would influence his early compositions. He worked briefly in Rome with Anton Raphael Mengs, before settling in Naples in 1752.  Naples was at the time experiencing a period of great artistic and cultural splendor due to the presence of the enlightened Charles III of Spain.  Nicknamed o Puzzulaniello or referred to as il Pozzolano, Giacinto succeeded in gaining within a short timespan a prominent place in the art scene of his time.

Among his works were:
Frescoes for the Palazzo Francavilla (now Palazzo Cellammare)
Frescoes for the Hospital of Santa Maria della Pace
Frescoes for church of the Pellegrini 
Two canvases for the church of Agostino della Zecca

He became professor at Naples' Accademia del Disegno in 1773 but continued to achieve a prolific output. Gaetano Gigante was one of his pupils.

Work
Giacinto Diano painted in a light, colourful and dramatic style. His works included paintings in a chapel in San Pietro ad Aram, and in the church of the Nunziata.

Sources

External links

1731 births
1803 deaths
People from Pozzuoli
18th-century Italian painters
Italian male painters
19th-century Italian painters
Painters from Naples
19th-century Italian male artists
18th-century Italian male artists